WJMA is a Country formatted broadcast radio station licensed to Culpeper, Virginia, serving Central Virginia.  WJMA is owned and operated by Piedmont Communications, Inc.

For a more complete history of WJMA

References

External links
 103.1 WJMA Online
 
 WJMA alumni web site

1971 establishments in Virginia
Country radio stations in the United States
Radio stations established in 1971
JMA